The Basilica of Our Lady of Candelaria or simply La Candelaria Church, as it is more popularly known, is a Roman Catholic church dedicated to the Virgin Mary under the title of Virgin of Candelaria. It is located in the center of the city of Medellín, Colombia, on the eastern side of Berrío Park. It is famous for being the oldest church in the city.

It was the church of the Archdiocese of Medellín from 1868 to 1931, when this title passed to the Cathedral Basilica of the Immaculate Conception. It is a colonial building with a Neoclassical style. Its original structure built in stone and mortar has been patched over throughout its history with unrelated materials.

On December 8, 1970, Pope Paul VI granted it the title of Minor basilica. Renovations occurred during 1997 and on July 31, 1998, by resolution 0795, the building was declared a National Monument of Colombia.

History
In 1616, the colonial visitor Francisco de Herrera y Campuzano founded a settlement with 80 Amerindians, naming it , today El Poblado Square. Three years later, the Spaniards started the construction of the Basilica of Our Lady of Candelaria, which was rebuilt at the end of the 18th century. It was dedicated to Our Lady of Candelaria, an invocation of special devotion to the Spanish and particularly for the sailors who crossed the Atlantic to the New World.

Interior

The main altar is made of gold-painted wood. A painting of the Virgin of Candelaria, the town's patron saint, is displayed above the altar.

See also
 Candelária Church (Rio de Janeiro, Brazil)
 Basilica of Candelaria (Tenerife, Spain)

References

Basilica churches in Colombia
Buildings and structures in Medellín
Landmarks in Colombia
National Monuments of Colombia
Spanish Colonial architecture in Colombia
Tourist attractions in Medellín